The 1992 Greek Ice Hockey Championship season was the fourth season of the Greek Ice Hockey Championship. Iptamenoi Pagodromoi Athinai won their first league title.

External links
List of champions on icehockey.gr

Greek Ice Hockey Championship seasons
Greek
Ice